Thelesperma megapotamicum is a perennial species of flowering plant in the aster family known by the common name wild tea and rayless greenthread. It is native to sections of the Americas, including the central United States, where it grows in many types of habitat.

Description
It is a perennial herb producing a slender, branching stem 30 to 60 centimeters tall or more. The leaves are narrow, mostly compound with linear or threadlike segments measuring a few centimeters long. The inflorescence bears several flower heads each in a cuplike involucre of phyllaries with purple-tinged, pointed lobes with white edges. The head contains many yellow or orange disc florets, and sometimes one or more yellow ray florets, although these may be absent.

Human uses
Native American groups such as the Hopi and Navajo use this plant to make herbal teas, as a medicinal remedy and a yellow dye. The plant can be boiled whole until the water turns a rusty color and used as a tea. In addition, the Hopi people also add the plant, along with water, into large glass jars and place in the sun to make sun tea.

References

Further reading

External links

 Jepson Manual Treatment
 Flora of North America
 Photo gallery

Coreopsideae
Plants used in traditional Native American medicine
Plant dyes